Hassan Abbaspour (September 29, 1944 in Tehran – June 28, 1981) was an Iranian politician who served as the minister of energy from 1979 to 1981. Abbaspour was assassinated along with more than 70 members of the Islamic Republic Party on 28 June 1981.

See also 
 Hafte Tir bombing
 Mahmoud Ghandi

References

Islamic Republican Party politicians
People assassinated by the People's Mojahedin Organization of Iran
Iranian terrorism victims
1944 births
1981 deaths